These television films and specials are scheduled to premiere in 2020.

References

2020 in American television
2020-related lists
Mass media timelines by year